Germacradienol synthase (EC 4.2.3.22, germacradienol/germacrene-D synthase, 2-trans,6-trans-farnesyl-diphosphate diphosphate-lyase [(1E,4S,5E,7R)-germacra-1(10),5-dien-11-ol-forming]) is an enzyme with systematic name (2E,6E)-farnesyl-diphosphate diphosphate-lyase ((1E,4S,5E,7R)-germacra-1(10),5-dien-11-ol-forming). This enzyme catalyses the following chemical reaction

 (2E,6E)-farnesyl diphosphate + H2O  (1E,4S,5E,7R)-germacra-1(10),5-dien-11-ol + diphosphate

This enzyme requires Mg2+ for activity.

References

External links 
 

EC 4.2.3